Ebba is a feminine given name.

Ebba may also refer to :

Places
 the modern Arabic name of the probable site of ancient Numidian Obba, Roman bishopric and now a Catholic titular see
 Ebba, Lebanon, a village of Lebanon

Other
 Ebba Grön, Swedish punk band also known as Ebba

See also 
 EBBA (European Border Breakers Award)
 Æbbe (disambiguation)